Parakeet is an Australian Army mobile battlefield communication system. It was introduced into service in the mid-1990s through project JP65. Parakeet was considered (at the time) advanced military communications. This included secure voice and data trunking services. Project JP2072 has been recently raised to upgrade its sub-systems. It is operated by Royal Australian Corps of Signals (RASIGS) personnel.

Military communications of Australia